Todoko-Ranu is a twin caldera complex on Halmahera island, Indonesia. The 2 km wide of lava-filled Todoko caldera is at the south of the 2 × 2.8 km wide of Ranu caldera. The Ranu caldera contains a volcanic cone Sahu and a caldera lake at the north side. No historical records are found from the caldera complex.

See also 

 List of volcanoes in Indonesia

References 

Active volcanoes
Mountains of Indonesia
Volcanoes of Halmahera
Volcanic crater lakes